Sound is an area situated to the south-west of central Lerwick, the capital of Shetland, Scotland.

Sound is home to a primary school of the same name.

References

External links

Canmore - Upper Sound, Norse Mill site record

Populated places in Shetland
Lerwick